Reza Abdi (born 5 May 1996) is an Iranian striker who currently plays in Machine Sazi the Iran Pro League.

References

1996 births
Iranian footballers
Association football forwards
Tractor S.C. players
Iran under-20 international footballers
Sportspeople from Tabriz
Living people